Konopnica  is a village in Wieluń County, Łódź Voivodeship, in central Poland. It is the seat of the gmina (administrative district) called Gmina Konopnica.

The village has a population of 840.

References

Villages in Wieluń County